Cortale is a  and town in the province of Catanzaro in the Calabria region of Italy.

Twin towns — sister cities
Cortale is twinned with:

  Erba, Lombardy, Italy 
  Ponte Lambro, Italy

Cities and towns in Calabria